Jiajiang County is a county in central Sichuan Province, China. It is under the administration of Leshan city.

Museums
 The Tenfu Tea Museum

Cultural attractions
 Jiajiang Thousand Buddha Rock Scenic Area, dating to the Tang Dynasty.

Climate

References

Further reading
 Eyferth, Jacob, "De-Industrialization in the Chinese Countryside: Handicrafts and Development in Jiajiang (Sichuan), 1935-1978", The China Quarterly, No. 173 (March 2003), pp. 53–73, Cambridge University Press on behalf of the School of Oriental and African Studies, London.

 
County-level divisions of Sichuan
Leshan